George Cox may refer to:

 George Cox (baseball) (1904–1995), baseball player
 George Cox Sr (1873–1949), English cricketer
 George Cox Jr (1911–1985), English cricketer, son of George Cox, Sr.
 George Cox (Jamaican cricketer) (1877–1945), Jamaican cricketer
 George Cox (cricketer, born 1859) (1859–1936), English cricketer
 George Cox (New South Wales politician) (1824–1901), member of the New South Wales Legislative Council and the New South Wales Legislative Assembly
 George Cox (Ottawa politician) (1834–1909), mayor of Ottawa, Ontario, 1894
 George Cox (Victorian politician) (born 1931), member of the Victorian Legislative Assembly and the Victorian Legislative Council
 George Albertus Cox (1840–1914), Canadian capitalist and Senator
 George B. Cox (1853–1916), Cincinnati machine politician known as Boss Cox
 George Bernard Cox (1886–1978), British architect
 George C. Cox (1851–1903), American photographer
 George G. Cox (1842–1920). American politician
 George M. Cox (1892–1977), flying ace
 George Valentine Cox (1786–1875), English author
 George William Cox (1827–1902), British historian
 George Cox Kahekili Ke'eaumoku II (1784–1824), governor of Maui
 George Cox (footballer) (born 1998), English footballer
 George L. Cox (1878–1947), American actor and film director

See also
 Cox (surname)